Gandajika Airport  was an airport serving Gandajika, a territory in the Kabinda district of the Kasaï-Oriental province, in the Democratic Republic of the Congo. The airport has been abandoned and is not visible on satellite imagery anymore.

Facilities

References

External links
 Aeronautical chart at SkyVector
 

Airports in Lomami